Hypostomus agna is a species of catfish in the family Loricariidae. It is native to South America, where it occurs in the Ribeira de Iguape River basin. It was formally described as a new species in 1907 by Brazilian ichthyologist Alípio de Miranda-Ribeiro, as a species of Plecostomus.

The species reaches 22 cm (8.7 inches) in total length and is thought to be a facultative air-breather. Its keels are absent or poorly developed. The caudal peduncle has a trapezoidal shape in cross-section. These two features are used to distinguish it between closely related species also present in the Ribeira de Iguape river basin.

References 

asperatus
Freshwater fish of Brazil
Fish described in 1907
Taxa named by Alípio de Miranda-Ribeiro